Cyclists is a 2018 Croatian-French animated short film by Veljko Popović, internationally co-produced and distributed by Bonobostudio.

Synopsis
The short is described as a comedy set in a small Mediterranean town, having unique aesthetics with vivid colors of summer as inspired by the art of Vasko Lipovac. The idea derived from a notable installation of 60 cyclists by the artist. The cycling season is nearing its grand finale. During the final race, the two men in the lead are competing for more than the Grand Trophy; they are fighting for the affection of a lady and fulfilment of their erotic fantasies. It is described as "In a small town next to the sea in Croatia, the cycling season is at its peak. During the final race the two leaders are not just battling for the grand prize, but also for the affection of a lady and fulfillment of their erotic fantasy."

Development
Veljko Popović closely studied Vasko Lipovac's art and variously experimented with CGI and 3D animation, trying to create character poses not seen in his art.

Reception
The short premiered at Animafest in June 2018, where it won the award for Best Croatian Film. It won further awards at Hiroshima International Animation Festival, Betina Film Festival, Linoleum Festival and Croatian Film Days as well as getting a Jury Award at Annecy. It was a staff pick at Vimeo and daily pick at Cartoon Brew.

Awards
Annecy (jury distinction for short film, 2018)
Hiroshima (special prize, 2018)
Animafest Zagreb (best Croatian film, 2018)
Krok (grand prix, 2018).

References

External links
 Watch Cyclists at Vimeo
 

2018 animated films
2018 films
2018 short films
2010s animated short films
Croatian animated short films